The Dreitannenriegel is a mountain, in the Bavarian Forest.

The mountain rises from the crest of the Anterior Bavarian Forest high above the Lower Bavarian county town of Deggendorf and lies in the municipality of Grafling. Nearby mountains are the Breitenauriegel, the Geißkopf and the Einödriegel.

At the summit is a large summit cross and a display board, that explains the  panorama which extends over large parts of Lower Bavaria. On clear autumn days in föhn conditions the Bavarian Alps may also be visible.

Several footpaths lead to the Dreitannenriegel from Grafling, Gotteszell, Habischried, Bischofsmais and Rusel. One of the steepest ascents in the Anterior Bavarian Forest runs along Path 3 from Mietraching in Deggendorf up through the Sauloch to Rohrmünz (c. 45 minutes) and from there almost directly up the fall line to the top. This section should only be attempted with suitable footwear as, especially in the area of the summit, smooth rock faces have to be negotiated.

The summit and a large proportion of the mountainsides are part of the Special Area of Conservation called the Deggendorfer Vorwald.

References

External links 

One-thousanders of Germany
Mountains of Bavaria
Mountains of the Bavarian Forest
Deggendorf (district)